The 1989 Badminton World Cup was the eleventh edition of an international tournament Badminton World Cup. The event was held in from 15 to 19 November 1989. China won the men's singles & women's doubles categories while South Korea secured titles in men's doubles & mixed doubles discipline. Indonesia's Susi won women's singles title.

Medalists

Men's singles

Finals

Women's singles

Finals

Men's doubles

Finals

Women's doubles

Finals

Mixed doubles

Finals

References 
 https://web.archive.org/web/20061214225028/http://tangkis.tripod.com/world/1989.htm
 
 
 Yang Yang and Susi clinch singles crowns
 Susi harapan tunggal Indonesia

Badminton World Cup
1989 in badminton
1989 in Chinese sport
Sports competitions in Guangzhou
International sports competitions hosted by China